Dingnan railway station serves the county of Dingnan in the city of Ganzhou in Jiangxi province, China.

References

Railway stations in Jiangxi
Stations on the Beijing–Kowloon Railway